The twenty-sixth season of the Case Closed anime was directed by Yasuichiro Yamamoto and produced by TMS Entertainment and Yomiuri Telecasting Corporation. The series is based on Gosho Aoyama's Case Closed manga series. In Japan, the series is titled  but was changed due to legal issues with the title Detective Conan. The episodes' plot follows Conan Edogawa's daily adventures.

The episodes use five pieces of theme music: two openings and three endings.

(This is also used for film 20: The Darkest Nightmare.)

The second ending theme is SAWAGE☆LIFE by Mai Kuraki and starts at episode 827 and was used until episode 842.

The third ending theme is YESTERDAY LOVE by Mai Kuraki and starts at episode 843 and was used until episode 864 of season 27. 

The season began airing on May 21, 2016 through April 22, 2017 on Nippon Television Network System in Japan. The season was later collected and released in ten DVD compilations by Shogakukan between January 26, 2019 and November 23, 2019, in Japan. Crunchyroll began simulcasting the series in October 2014, starting with episode 754. 



Episode list

References
References

Season26
2016 Japanese television seasons
2017 Japanese television seasons